The 2018 Rostelecom Cup was the fifth event of six in the 2018–19 ISU Grand Prix of Figure Skating, a senior-level international invitational competition series. It was held on November 16–18, 2018 in Moscow, Russia. Medals were awarded in the disciplines of men's singles, ladies' singles, pair skating, and ice dancing. Skaters earned points toward qualifying for the 2018–19 Grand Prix Final.

Entries 
The ISU published the preliminary assignments on June 29, 2018.

Changes to preliminary assignments

Records 

The following new ISU best scores were set during this competition:

Results

Men
Yuzuru Hanyu set a new world record for the short program (110.53).

Ladies
Alina Zagitova set a new world record for the short program (80.78).

Pairs

Ice dancing

References

External links
  at the International Skating Union

Rostelecom Cup
Rostelecom Cup
Rostelecom Cup
November 2018 sports events in Russia